Qaifah Al Mahn Yazid is a sub-district located in the Al Quraishyah District, Al Bayda Governorate, Yemen. Qaifah Al Mahn Yazid had a population of 24455 according to the 2004 census.

References 

Sub-districts in Al Quraishyah District